University Park Mall is a shopping mall in metropolitan South Bend–Mishawaka metropolitan area (Mishawaka, Indiana, USA) and is owned by Simon Property Group. The anchors are Macy's, JCPenney and Barnes & Noble. The mall was originally anchored by a  Hudson's and a  L. S. Ayres. Hudson's became Marshall Field's in 1997, which closed in 2006 and was torn down in 2007. The L. S. Ayres store was renamed Macy's on September 9, 2006. The former Marshall Field's was replaced by an outdoor concourse anchored by Barnes & Noble. Sears, one of the original anchors of the mall when it first opened, closed during 2019.

History
Edward J. DeBartolo Corporation first announced plans for University Park Mall in 1976.

References

External links
 University Park Mall - Simon.com

Shopping malls in Indiana
Simon Property Group
Buildings and structures in South Bend, Indiana
Shopping malls established in 1979
Tourist attractions in South Bend, Indiana
Mishawaka, Indiana